Cans et Cévennes is a commune in the department of Lozère, southern France. The municipality was established on 1 January 2016 by merger of the former communes of Saint-Laurent-de-Trèves and Saint-Julien-d'Arpaon.

References

See also 
Communes of the Lozère department

Communes of Lozère
Populated places established in 2016
2016 establishments in France